This is a list of museums in Tanzania.

List

National museums
 National Museum of Tanzania, Dar-es-salaam
 Dar-es-salaam Museum
 Village Museum Tanzania, Kijitonyama (photos)
 The Arusha Declaration Museum, Arusha
 Maji Maji Rebellion Museum, Songea
 Mwalimu Nyerere Museum Centre, Butiama

Natural history
 National Natural History Museum
 Olduvai Gorge Museum, Ngorongoro Conservation Area

Other regions
 Olpopongi Masai Cultural village and Museum
 Regional Museum, Singida
 Sukuma Museum, Mwanza
 Iringa Boma Museum & Cultural center, Iringa
 Shinyanga Mazingira Museum, Shinyanga

Zanzibar museums
 Palace Museum, Zanzibar
 Zanzibar National History House and Culture (also called House of Wonders or Beit al-Ajaib)
 Peace Memorial Museum (Beit al-Amani)
 Zanzibar Natural History Museum (photos) 
 Unguja Ukuu Archaeological Site Museum
 Princess Salme Museum, Zanzibar
 Freddie Mercury Museum, Zanzibar

See also
 List of museums

External links
 Museums in Tanzania

 
Tanzania
Museums
Museums
Museums
Tanzania